Illhaeusern is a commune in the Haut-Rhin department in Grand Est in north-eastern France.

The village stands at the confluence of the rivers Ill and Fecht. Its name means "houses near the river Ill".

Illhaeusern is famous for the Auberge de l'Ill, still one of the oldest 3-star establishments in France.
It was managed until 2008 by Paul Haeberlin, his son Marc took over after his death.

See also
 Communes of the Haut-Rhin département

References

Communes of Haut-Rhin